Mihai Gabriel Țala (born 26 September 2004) is a Romanian professional footballer who plays as a defender for Liga I side Gaz Metan Mediaș.

References

External links
 

2004 births
Living people
People from Mediaș
Romanian footballers
Association football defenders
Liga I players
CS Gaz Metan Mediaș players